Barbara Simpson Kerr is a retired equestrian from Canada who won a gold medal at the 1971 Pan American Games and a bronze medal at the 1974 Show Jumping World Championships. She also won the 1967 and 1981 national jumping titles, the 1969 Aachen Horse Show, the 1972 Rothman's Grand Prix, and the 1972 Calgary International Horse Show.

References

Year of birth missing (living people)
Living people
Canadian female equestrians
Pan American Games gold medalists for Canada
Pan American Games medalists in equestrian
Equestrians at the 1971 Pan American Games
Medalists at the 1971 Pan American Games